Shameless is a Canadian magazine with a feminist and anti-oppressive practice perspective for girls and trans youth. It is published three times a year and also maintains a website featuring a blog, web stories and audio content. Shameless is a registered not-for-profit.

History and awards 

Shameless  is an independent Canadian voice for young women and trans youth. Its focus is broader than many teen magazines, packed with articles about arts, culture and current events, reflecting the diversity of their readers’ interests and experiences. Shameless was founded in 2004 by Nicole Cohen and Melinda Mattos.

Shameless  strives to practice and develop an inclusive feminism. An independent publication, Shameless  is a grassroots magazine produced by a team of volunteer staff members. The publishers have expressed a commitment to supporting and empowering young writers, editors, designers and artists, especially those from communities that are underrepresented in the mainstream media.

Each issue of Shameless  includes profiles of amazing women, discussion of trending topics, DIY guides to crafty activities, sports dispatches, the latest in technology, columns on food politics, health & sexuality, advice and more. Shameless  also runs a podcast, Shameless Talks, that can be found on their website and iTunes.

In June 2004, Shameless was named Best New Magazine by Toronto alt-weekly NOW and nominated for two Utne Independent Press Awards (Best New Title and Best Design). In 2005, Shameless won an Utne award for Best Personal Life Writing. The magazine was nominated again in 2006, for Lifestyle coverage. In 2005, cover story “Making The Cut” was nominated for a National Magazine Award.

Published three times a year, Shameless is available in independent bookstores and Chapters/Indigo locations across Canada and select locations in the United States.

The blog 

Shameless  also hosts a blog, which was named Best Feminist Blog in Canada in February 2008 by the Canadian F-Word Blog Awards and shortlisted again in 2012. The site has also won Best Entertainment Blog. Frequent topics include representation of women and trans folks, youth, race and sexuality in mainstream culture, independent artists and musicians, pop culture, news and current events.

The anthology 
 
In Spring 2009, Megan Griffith-Greene and Stacey May Fowles published She's Shameless: Women write about growing up, rocking out and fighting back with Tightrope Books. The book contains essays by women and trans-identified adults about their experiences as teens.

References

External links
Shameless magazine

Youth magazines published in Canada
Women's magazines published in Canada
Feminism in Ontario
Feminist blogs
Magazines published in Toronto
Triannual magazines published in Canada
Feminist magazines
Magazines established in 2004
2004 establishments in Ontario